Irish Problem or Irish problem may refer to:
 Irish Question, late-19th-/early-20th–century UK political debate about the constitutional status of Ireland
 The Troubles, conflict in Northern Ireland during the late 20th century
 "An Irish solution to an Irish problem", political catchphrase
 The discrimination and persecution of Irish Americans

See also
 :Category:Controversies in Ireland